Bachia cacerensis is a species of lizard in the family Gymnophthalmidae. It is endemic to Brazil.

References

Bachia
Reptiles described in 1998
Reptiles of Brazil
Endemic fauna of Brazil
Taxa named by Maria Ignêz Castrillon
Taxa named by Christine Strüssman